A counting process is a stochastic process {N(t), t ≥ 0} with values that are non-negative, integer, and non-decreasing:

 N(t) ≥ 0.
 N(t) is an integer.
 If s ≤ t then N(s) ≤ N(t).

If s < t, then N(t) − N(s) is the number of events occurred during the interval (s, t ]. Examples of counting processes include Poisson processes and Renewal processes.

Counting processes deal with the number of occurrences of something over time. An example of a counting process is the number of job arrivals to a queue over time.

If a process has the Markov property, it is said to be a Markov counting process.

References

 Ross, S.M. (1995) Stochastic Processes. Wiley. 
 Higgins JJ, Keller-McNulty S (1995) Concepts in Probability and Stochastic Modeling. Wadsworth Publishing Company. 

Stochastic processes